Woodentop may refer to:

 The Woodentops (TV series), a 1950s BBC children's series
 The Woodentops,  a British rock band
 Woodentop, a pejorative term used by plain-clothed British police for uniformed police officers
 "Woodentop" (The Bill), the pilot episode of the long-running television programme The Bill